Philip Speiser (born 12 October 1990 in Vienna, Austria) is an Austrian music producer and composer living in Vienna.

He started his career at the age of 15 with the electro project Dirty Disco Youth which got the attention of superstar DJ Steve Aoki who quickly signed him. Phil has had several International Club Hits plus official remixes released by the likes of Selena Gomez & Robyn. He toured worldwide until the age of 20 playing in front of crowds of over 100k across Asia. He also completed an Australia tour with Skrillex.

At 20 Phil started producing and writing for various international artists.

From 2014 to 2018, he was a member and producer of the fifth chapter of German band Scooter, Rick J. Jordan who had been with the band for their full career at the time, and for whom Phil produced & co-wrote 3 Top 10 albums, which included the hits OI and BORA! BORA! BORA! before completing their biggest arena tours ever.

His productions include features with Iggy Azalea, Wiz Khalifa and Snoop Dogg.

He has composed tracks for various big advertising campaigns including Audi, Lidl, & Nylon Magazine.

References

1990 births
Living people
Musicians from Vienna
Musicians from Hamburg
German electronic musicians